Simon Pouplin (born 28 May 1985) is a French former professional footballer who played as a goalkeeper.

Career
In 2005, Pouplin signed his first professional contract with Rennes, signing with the Breton club for three years. He made his debut in the 2003–04 Ligue 1 season. He played for Bundesliga side SC Freiburg from the 2007–08 season until the 2010–11 season. He was on trial with Évian TG from Ligue 1 in July 2011 but was not signed due to injury.

After spending one year without a team, Pouplin signed a three-year contract with Ligue 1 outfit FC Sochaux-Montbéliard in July 2012.

References

External links

1985 births
Living people
People from Cholet
Sportspeople from Maine-et-Loire
French footballers
Association football goalkeepers
France under-21 international footballers
Ligue 1 players
Bundesliga players
2. Bundesliga players
Stade Rennais F.C. players
SC Freiburg players
FC Sochaux-Montbéliard players
OGC Nice players
French expatriate footballers
French expatriate sportspeople in Germany
Expatriate footballers in Germany
Footballers from Pays de la Loire